John J. Doll (September 8, 1948 - May 20, 2021) is the former Acting United States Under Secretary of Commerce for Intellectual Property and Acting director of the United States Patent and Trademark Office (USPTO) due to the resignation of Jon W. Dudas on January 20, 2009. Before that, Doll was Commissioner for Patents at the USPTO. He joined the Patent and Trademark Office in 1974.

Doll retired from the USPTO in 2009. After leaving the USPTO, he became a patent consultant, working as an expert witness in patent matters.

References

External links
 JohnJDoll.com - Patent Consulting Website
 Biography on the USPTO web site
 PTO Today July/August 2001 

Place of birth missing (living people)
Living people
Under Secretaries of Commerce for Intellectual Property
1948 births